John Kosgei, (born 15 July 1973) is a Kenyan athlete who specializes in middle- and long-distance running. He won the gold medal in the 3000 metres steeplechase at the 1998 Commonwealth Games in Kuala Lumpur, Malaysia.

References 

Living people
1973 births
Kenyan male steeplechase runners
Commonwealth Games gold medallists for Kenya
Athletes (track and field) at the 1998 Commonwealth Games
Commonwealth Games medallists in athletics
Kenyan male cross country runners
Goodwill Games medalists in athletics
Competitors at the 1998 Goodwill Games
Medallists at the 1998 Commonwealth Games